"The Modern Bop" is a song by Australian rock band Mondo Rock, released in July 1984 as the third and final single from the band's fourth studio album The Modern Bop (1984). The song peaked at number 85 on the Kent Music Report.

Track listings 
Aus 7" Single
 "The Modern Bop" - 3:45
 "Cost of Living" - 3:40

Aus 12" Single
 "The Modern Bop"  (New York remix)  - 6:53
 "The Modern Bop"  (Instrumental)  - 5:48
 "Winds - Light to Variable" - 4:14

Charts

References

Mondo Rock songs
1984 singles
1984 songs
Songs written by Ross Wilson (musician)
Warner Music Group singles